Circleville is a city in Jackson County, Kansas, United States.  As of the 2020 census, the population of the city was 153.

History
Circleville was founded in 1863. It may have been named after Circleville, Ohio, or because the town "circled" around the prairie.

Geography
Circleville is located at  (39.508927, -95.858045).

Climate
This climatic region is typified by large seasonal temperature differences, with warm to hot (and often humid) summers and cold (sometimes severely cold) winters.  According to the Köppen Climate Classification system, Circleville has a humid subtropical climate, abbreviated "Cfa" on climate maps.

Demographics

Circleville is part of the Topeka, Kansas Metropolitan Statistical Area.

2010 census
As of the census of 2010, there were 170 people, 69 households, and 47 families residing in the city. The racial makeup of the city was 95.3% White, 0.6% African American, and 4.1% Native American. Hispanic or Latino of any race were 1.2% of the population.

There were 69 households, of which 34.8% had children under the age of 18 living with them, 52.2% were married couples living together, 11.6% had a female householder with no husband present, 4.3% had a male householder with no wife present, and 31.9% were non-families. 26.1% of all households were made up of individuals, and 11.6% had someone living alone who was 65 years of age or older. The average household size was 2.46 and the average family size was 2.83.

The median age in the city was 36.5 years. 28.2% of residents were under the age of 18; 8.2% were between the ages of 18 and 24; 20.6% were from 25 to 44; 26.5% were from 45 to 64; and 16.5% were 65 years of age or older. The gender makeup of the city was 53.5% male and 46.5% female.

2000 census
As of the census of 2000, there were 185 people, 77 households, and 49 families residing in the city. The racial makeup of the city was 92.97% White, 2.70% Native American, 0.54% Asian, 0.54% from other races, and 3.24% from two or more races. Hispanic or Latino of any race were 2.70% of the population.

There were 77 households, out of which 40.3% had children under the age of 18 living with them, 51.9% were married couples living together, 7.8% had a female householder with no husband present, and 35.1% were non-families. 32.5% of all households were made up of individuals, and 10.4% had someone living alone who was 65 years of age or older. The average household size was 2.40 and the average family size was 3.00.

In the city, the population was spread out, with 30.3% under the age of 18, 7.6% from 18 to 24, 30.3% from 25 to 44, 19.5% from 45 to 64, and 12.4% who were 65 years of age or older. The median age was 31 years. For every 100 females, there were 110.2 males. For every 100 females age 18 and over, there were 87.0 males.

The median income for a household in the city was $32,885, and the median income for a family was $34,750. Males had a median income of $22,083 versus $20,000 for females. The per capita income for the city was $14,293. About 12.2% of families and 10.9% of the population were below the poverty line, including 15.7% of those under the age of eighteen and 16.0% of those 65 or over.

Education
The community is served by North Jackson USD 335 public school district.

References

Further reading

External links
 Circleville - Directory of Public Officials
 Circleville city map, KDOT

Cities in Kansas
Cities in Jackson County, Kansas
Topeka metropolitan area, Kansas